Basketball at the 2020 Summer Olympics in Tokyo, Japan was held from 24 July to 8 August 2021. The basketball competitions were held at the Saitama Super Arena in Saitama, while the debuting 3x3 competitions were held at the temporary Aomi Urban Sports Park in Tokyo.

Medal summary

Medal table

Events

Qualification summary

5-on-5 basketball

Qualification
The National Olympic Committees may enter only one 12-player men's team and only one 12-player women's team. The men's qualification was impacted by the COVID-19 pandemic whereas the women's qualification ended on time and unaffected.

Men's qualification

Women's qualification

Twelve teams qualified for the women's tournament. The host nation and the 2018 World Cup winners qualified. Those two teams, however, had to play in the pre-qualifying and qualifying tournaments and each took up one of the qualifying spots from those tournaments. Thus, while two of the World Qualifying Tournaments provided quota spots to their three top teams, the other two tournaments provided quota spots only to the top two teams plus either the host nation or the World Cup winners.

Teams had to qualify for the World Olympic Qualifying Tournaments through Women's EuroBasket or Pre-Olympic Qualifying Tournaments (which themselves had to be qualified for through Continental Cups).

Competition schedule

Men's tournament

Preliminary round

Group A

Group B

Group C

Third-placed team rankings

Knockout stage

Final standings

Women's tournament

Preliminary round

Group A

Group B

Group C

Third-placed team rankings

Knockout stage

Final standings

3x3 basketball
On June 9, 2017, the International Olympic Committee announced that 3x3 basketball would be contested at the Summer Olympics for the first time in 2020.

Qualification
Qualification for 3x3 determined the eight teams in each of the men's and women's tournaments. The host country, Japan, was guaranteed only one place, not one per gender. Four teams per gender (reduced to three if Japan uses its guaranteed place) were determined via world ranking. Three teams per gender were selected through an Olympic Qualifying Tournament. The final team per gender were determined in a Universality Olympic Qualifying Tournament.

Men

Women

Men's tournament

Pool

Knockout stage

Final standings

Women's tournament

Pool

Knockout stage

Final standings

See also 
Wheelchair basketball at the 2020 Summer Paralympics

References

External links
 Basketball at the Tokyo Olympics official website 
 3x3 basketball at the Tokyo Olympics official website 
 Results book – 3x3 Basketball 
 Results book – Basketball 

 
2020
2020 Summer Olympics events
Olympics
International basketball competitions hosted by Japan